Ryan Maki (born April 23, 1985) is an American former professional ice hockey right winger who played for the Milwaukee Admirals of the American Hockey League and the Hannover Scorpions of the Deutsche Eishockey Liga (DEL).

Playing career
Maki grew up in Shelby Twp, MI and was selected to play in the U.S. National Development Team Program as a junior from 2001 to 2003. Maki was recruited and attended Harvard University in the ECAC and majored in economics.

He was drafted from Harvard in the sixth round, 176th overall, of the 2005 NHL Entry Draft by the Nashville Predators. After graduating from College, Maki signed a two-year entry level contract with the Predators and was reassigned to American Hockey League affiliate, the Milwaukee Admirals. During the 2008–09 season, Maki was named as the Admirals winner for the AHL man of the year award.

Prior to the 2010–11 season, Maki left North America and after trialling with the Hannover Scorpions, was signed to a contract on September 2, 2010. Despite improving his offensive output in the following season with the Scorpions, Maki announced his retirement from professional hockey on August 10, 2012.

Career statistics

Regular season and playoffs

International

References

External links

1985 births
American men's ice hockey right wingers
Cincinnati Cyclones (ECHL) players
Hannover Scorpions players
Harvard Crimson men's ice hockey players
Living people
Milwaukee Admirals players
Nashville Predators draft picks
People from Medford, New Jersey
Sportspeople from Burlington County, New Jersey
Ice hockey players from New Jersey